Milka Kraljev (born 8 November 1982) is an Argentine rower. She competed at the 2004 Summer Olympics and the 2012 Summer Olympics. She also competed at the 2020 Summer Olympics.

References

External links
 

1982 births
Living people
Argentine female rowers
Olympic rowers of Argentina
Rowers at the 2004 Summer Olympics
Rowers at the 2012 Summer Olympics
Rowers from Buenos Aires
Pan American Games medalists in rowing
Pan American Games gold medalists for Argentina
Pan American Games bronze medalists for Argentina
Rowers at the 2019 Pan American Games
Rowers at the 2011 Pan American Games
Rowers at the 2015 Pan American Games
Medalists at the 2019 Pan American Games
Medalists at the 2011 Pan American Games
Medalists at the 2015 Pan American Games
Rowers at the 2020 Summer Olympics
21st-century Argentine women